Wendy Mark (1950) is a painter and printmaker primarily known for her work in monotype. She began her career as a writer and has continued to combine art and literature by producing limited edition books with Mark Strand, Charles Simic, Paul Muldoon, David St. John, Adam Gopnik and Louis Menand.

Early life and education
Mark studied art history at Brandeis University and earned an MFA in poetry from Columbia University in 1974. She studied painting at the National Academy of Design, School of Fine Arts on New York's Upper East Side. Soon after finishing her studies there, in 1988, she participated in the institution's annual juried exhibition and caught the eye of New York Times art critic John Russell, who wrote, “Had I a prize of my own to give, it would have gone to one of the smallest entries in the show, a monotype by Wendy Mark…A whole show by this artist would be worth waiting for.”

References

Year of birth missing (living people)
Living people
American women painters
American women printmakers
Brandeis University alumni
Columbia University School of the Arts alumni